Preston Hall may refer to:
Preston Hall, Aylesford, Kent
Preston Hall, Midlothian
Preston Hall, Preston-on-Tees
Preston Hall (Waitsburg, Washington)

See also
Preston House (disambiguation)

Architectural disambiguation pages